Payday loans in the United Kingdom  are typically small value (up to £1500) and for short periods. Payday loans are often used as a term by members of the public (and commentators) generically to refer to all forms of High-cost Short-term credit (HCSTC) including instalment loans, e.g. 3-9 month products, rather than just loans provided until the next pay day.

Market overview
The provision of Payday (HTSTC) loans is overseen by the UK's Financial Conduct Authority. FCA data sizes the UK market, in the twelve months to 2018, at 5.4 million loans per year. This is a significant reduction from in 2013, before FCA regulation of the sector, when the market was c. 10 million loans a year.  In terms of value the FCA sizes the market with consumers borrowing c. 1.3bn a year, making the average loan size c. £250.

The market is concentrated. In 2018 the FCA identified 88 firms providing loans however 85% of loans were provided by just ten players. Since that time a number of key players have left the market.  This includes Wonga, Enova (trading as Quickquid and Onstride), Dollar (Moneyshop, Payday Express, Payday UK), Curo/Cash euro net (trading as Wageday Advance).  As at June 2021 the largest players left in the market were Mr Lender and Lending Stream, although there are many other lenders include CashFloat, Money boat and The Money Hive.

Most of the players are members of the trade association, The Consumer Finance Association.

Customer profile 
In 2018 the FCA published their financial lives research. This gave insight into customers of different product types (among other segmentations). From this research, Payday loan and installment loan customers tend to be younger overindexing in the 25-34 year old agegroup.  They are less likely to have a degree however are not necessarily low income, overindexing in the £30-50k range.

Regulation
Under the Consumer Credit Act 1974 lenders must have a licence from the UK Office of Fair Trading (OFT) to offer consumer credit. The Consumer Credit Act 2006 explicitly requires the OFT to consider irresponsible lending in its evaluation of whether a lender is fit to hold a licence. There are currently no restrictions on the interest rates payday loan companies can charge or on rolling over loans, however the government is pending new legislation to cap the costs of such loans. Advertising of payday lending is subject to the Consumer Credit (Advertisements) Regulations 2004. This means that the "typical APR" must be stated in adverts which meet certain criteria, such as adverts which indicate that credit will be given to customers who may otherwise find access to credit restricted. Advertising is regulated by the Advertising Standards Authority (ASA), and there have been several cases of the ASA upholding complaints against advertising by payday lenders.

In June 2010 the OFT published a "review of high-cost credit." In this report they concluded that changes could be made to the industry itself, but that "more radical approaches would be required if the Government or others wanted to tackle the wider social, economic and financial context in which high-cost credit markets exist."

To get a good idea of the size and range of payday loan companies operating in the UK, comparison sites are a useful tool, as recommended in the OFT report – "We recommend that the Government works with industry groups to provide information on high-cost credit loans to consumers through price comparison websites. If this cannot be undertaken on a voluntary basis, the Government should consider the case for introducing legislation to create a single website allowing consumers to compare the features of home credit, payday and pawnbroking loans alongside credit unions and other lenders in their local area."

In March 2013 the OFT published a long-awaited update regarding the industry. It was very critical, giving the 50 leading lenders just 60 days to address the issues raised or risk losing their licences. In particular, it cited "a failure to work out whether people could afford the loans, aggressive debt collection practices, a failure to explain how repayments are collected, and a lack of sufficient forbearance for those who cannot afford the repayments." It referred the market to the Competition Commission for "deep-rooted problems in how payday loan companies compete"

In 2018 following a lawsuit between a man from Chorley, Lancashire, England and the Financial conduct authority, new laws were introduced with new restrictions on payday loans in the UK. These rules introduced three key points of regulation:

 An interest rate cap of 0.8% per day – Lowering the cost for most borrowers. For all high-cost short-term credit loans, interest and fees must not exceed 0.8% per day of the amount borrowed.
 Fixed default fees capped at £15 – Protecting borrowers struggling to repay. If borrowers do not repay their loans on time, default charges must not exceed £15. Interest on unpaid balances and default charges must not exceed the initial rate. 
 Total cost cap of 100% – Protects borrowers from escalating debts. Borrowers must never have to pay back more in fees and interest than the amount borrowed.

Advertising

Google
Google declared that as of 13 July 2016, advertising of payday loans would no longer be possible however this implementation was limited in the UK. While in some countries the new search policy prevented ads for loans with an annual percentage or 36% or more, in the UK the only limitation was banning ads with a repayment period of 60 days or less from the date of issue. This implementation meant that, while loans of one or two months were not advertised, a number of lenders moved into installment loans of 3–12 months duration as an alternative to payday loans.

Brokers
Until new FCA regulations was enforced on the industry in 2015, the brokers used to include a broker fee, which was often payable upfront; meaning the applicant must have paid a fee merely to apply for an advertised loan, in addition to the high rate of interest. The OFT has urged the government to tighten restrictions on payday loans.

Criticism 
There has been considerable criticism of the short-term loans market in the UK. Vince Cable MP said in 2008 that "the growing popularity of these kinds of short-term loans highlights the problems stemming from the credit crunch and unsustainable levels of personal debt in the UK." Chris Tapp of debt charity Credit Action said in mid-2008: "Over the past year, payday loans have become an issue in the UK, and the growth in people who have such a loan and have problems has been notable in the last six months."

Credit Action made a complaint to the OFT that payday lenders were placing advertisements on social network website Facebook which broke advertising regulations. Its main complaint was that the APR was either not displayed at all or not displayed prominently enough, which is clearly required by UK advertising standards.

In 2010 a campaign organised by pressure group Compass to "end legal loan sharking" and apply interest rate caps in the "high cost credit sector" saw over 200 MPs sign an Early Day Motion by April 2011. Other motions on the subject have been made in previous years, and groups such as Debt on our Doorstep have previously highlighted the issue.

The writer Carl Packman has criticised the regulation of the industry. Packman says: "given the regulatory landscape currently in force we have to trust [lenders] on their word that they follow a self-defeating business model ... Indeed payday lenders break their promise on responsible lending all the time."

The widely criticized payday lender Wonga.com was one of the biggest finance firms in Britain. Wonga has faced widespread criticism over its interest rates, allegedly heavy-handed debt collection methods and its £24 million shirt sponsorship deal with Newcastle United football club that some say will tempt impressionable young fans to get into debt. Another concern over evidence it had allowed children to borrow cash. Although under-18s are banned from taking out loans with the firm, young people are finding ways to convince Wonga's "automated, real-time risk and decision system" that they are eligible for its 4,214 percent APR loans. In 2012 the company became the target of identity thieves, with hundreds of cases of UK individuals being chased by the company for repayment of loans they have never applied for.

In 2013 payday broker Cash Lady was widely criticised over an advertising campaign which featured Kerry Katona. Following complaints to the ASA in May 2013, Cash Lady adverts were re-edited to remove the phrase 'Fast Cash for Fast Lives'.  The ASA believed this implied that payday loans would help fund a high-flying celebrity lifestyle. In July 2013, Katona declared bankruptcy for the second time, and was dropped by Cash Lady. One month later the ASA ruled that Cash Lady could no longer use Katona in adverts, as she was too heavily associated in people's minds with debt.

In January 2014 247Moneybox along with other payday lenders was accused by the consumer group Which? of using "excessive" default fees to cut their headline rates of interest. Which? Found that "Ten of 17 leading payday lenders we looked at have default fees of £20 or more, and four charged £25 and above". Since January 2015 the FCA have capped default fees that can be charged for a missed payment to £15 and that the total amount a borrower has to repay cannot exceed 100% of the amount borrowed, inclusive of all fees and interest.

References

Finance in the United Kingdom